Eilema sandakana is a moth of the subfamily Arctiinae. It is found on Borneo.

References

 Natural History Museum Lepidoptera generic names catalog

sandakana